The Workers' Trade Union Association of Croatia is a trade union centre in Croatia. It was founded in 1994 under the name Trade Union Association of Public Sector Employees.

It is affiliated with the European Federation of Public Service Employees.

External links
 www.ursh.hr

References

Trade unions in Croatia
Trade unions established in 1994